Eric James Cremin (15 June 1914 – 29 December 1973) was an Australian professional golfer who, later in his career, was instrumental in the establishment of the Far East Circuit, later known as the Asia Golf Circuit.

Cremin was born in Mascot, New South Wales. He played mostly in Australasia, only occasionally travelling to Europe to compete, but enjoyed great success on the Australian circuit, including victories in the 1949 Australian Open and the 1937 and 1938 Australian PGA Championship. After World War II, Cremin was runner-up in the Australian PGA Championship a further seven times, including 1946 to 1948 consecutively.

In 1959, Cremin and a Welsh international golfer, Kim Hall, established a tournament in Hong Kong to provide an additional event for the Australian professionals who were travelling to play in the Philippine Open. The Hong Kong Open was a great success, and within a few years, similar tournaments had been founded in Singapore, Malaysia, Thailand, Taiwan and Japan, and the Far East Circuit had become firmly established.

Cremin died of a heart attack while playing golf in Singapore.

Professional wins (28)

PGA Tour of Australasia (28)
1937 Australian PGA Championship, New South Wales PGA
1938 Australian PGA Championship, New South Wales PGA
1946 Queensland Open, Victorian PGA Championship
1947 New South Wales PGA, Victorian PGA Championship
1948 Queensland Open
1949 Australian Open, New South Wales Close, Victorian PGA Championship, Western Australia Open, Lakes Open
1950 New South Wales Close, Queensland Open, Adelaide Advertiser Tournament, McWilliam's Wines Tournament, New South Wales PGA, Lakes Open
1951 Adelaide Advertiser Tournament
1953 Lakes Open
1954 New South Wales PGA, Western Australia Open
1955 Ampol Tournament 		
1956 Queensland Open
1957 Queensland Open
1960 Adelaide Advertiser Tournament

Team appearances
Vicars Shield (representing New South Wales): 1937 (winners), 1938 (winners), 1939, 1946 (winners), 1947 (winners), 1948 (winners), 1949 (winners), 1950 (winners), 1951, 1952, 1953, 1954 (winners), 1955 (winners)

References

External links
Australian Dictionary of Biography

Australian male golfers
Golfers from Sydney
1914 births
1973 deaths